The Bangladesh e-Government Computer Incident Response Team (BGD e-Gov CIRT) is the state-run agency of the government of Bangladesh responsible for maintaining cybersecurity in the country. Works under the Ministry of Posts, Telecommunications and Information Technology, it is the national computer emergency response team (CERT) with prim focus on  receiving and reviewing, and responding to cybersecurity incidents in the country.

BGD e-Gov CIRT conduct research in the field of cybersecurity and issues advisory on security-oriented vulnerabilities in coordination with various government and non-government organizations, including critical infrastructures, financial organizations, law enforcement agencies, academia and civil society. It works within its framework for providing assistance for the improvement of national defense system of Bangladesh. It has maintained a network with foreign organizations and communities for transborder cybersecurity-related matters.

Service components 
BGD e-Gov CIRT has 8 active service components designed for various cybersecurity matters, including computer systems, networks, capacity building and internet security awareness among others.
Incident Handling Unit
Digital Forensic Unit
Cyber Awareness and Capacity Building Unit
Cyber Sensor Unit
Cyber Range Unit
Cyber Risk Assessment Unit
Critical Information Infrastructure Unit
Cyber Audit Unit

History 
BGD e-Gov CIRT was established by the federal government after the Bangladesh Bank robbery incident took place. It was originally introduced by the Bangladesh Computer Council (BCC) in 2015. BGD e-GOV CIRT became operational in February 2016.

It also signed a memorandum of understanding (MoU) with the government of India's Ministry of Electronics and Information Technology on 8 April 2017 and remained the member of the Indian Computer Emergency Response Team until 7 April 2022. It is also a permanent member of the OIC Computer Emergency Response Team. In September 2018 BGD e-Gov CIRT became a trusted introducer incorporated by the European Computer Incident Response Team.

References

Further reading 
 
 

Computer emergency response teams
National cyber security centres
2016 establishments in Bangladesh
Government agencies of Bangladesh
Information technology in Bangladesh